Brian Conaghan (born 6 October 1971) is a Scottish author, based in Dublin. He is best known for his books The Boy Who Made it Rain (2011),  When Mr Dog Bites (2014), The Bombs That Brought Us Together (2016),  and We Come Apart (2017), (co-authored with Sarah Crossan). When Mr Dog Bites, a book about a teenage boy with Tourette's, was shortlisted for both Children's Books Ireland and the Carnegie Medal in 2015. The Bombs That Brought Us Together won the Costa Children's Book Award in 2016.

References

Living people
1971 births
Scottish writers
Writers from Dublin (city)